Valencia, officially the Municipality of Valencia,  is a 4th class municipality in the province of Bohol, Philippines. According to the 2020 census, it has a population of 28,392 people.

It is on the southern coast of Bohol,  from Tagbilaran.

There are elementary schools in the poblacion and in the barrios. For their secondary education, students go to Valencia High School, a public school.

Valencia is the birthplace of former Executive Secretary Juan Pajo.

The town of Valencia, Bohol celebrates its feast on every 3rd Saturday of January to honor the town patron saint, Sr. Santo Niño.

History

Its former name used to be Panangatan, which comes from the root word sang-at, meaning "to put up on an elevated place". This referred to the practice of fishermen from Dimiao and Lila who would put up (sang-at) their boats on the banks of the Panangatan River when taking shelter during the southwest monsoons. Here nipa palms grew along the river, preventing the boats from being washed away by the waves.

Panangatan remained part of Dimiao until 1867. That year a Spanish priest was assigned to the place and it became a separate municipality. The priest gave it a new name, naming after his birthplace in Spain. In 1879 Valencia had a population of 7,009.

Geography

Barangays
Valencia comprises 35 barangays:

Climate

Demographics

Economy

The principal industries of the people today are weaving, pot making, and fishing. The most important produce is coconuts, rice, corn and fish.

Market day, locally known as Tabu, is Sunday. Local produce such as fresh fruits, vegetable, fresh meat and live poultry are sold. The days of this weekly community occasion differ from town to town.

Badiang Spring resort in barangay Anas is a major contribution to local economic activity. Badiang Spring has continuously flowing water from subterranean rocks, which is its main attraction. Not just domestic tourists but foreign tourists too frequent the  lot by the shore. Badiang Spring has separate swimming pools for adults and children as well as accommodation facilities.

Culture

Valencia Parish Church

The parish of the Santo Niño and the town of Valencia began as barrio Panangatan of Dimiao.  Together with adjacent barrios, it was constituted a town in 1869 and a parish in 1871 and named after a city on Spain's southern coast. The church building commenced during the term of Fray Mariano Cornago (1870–77) and was completed in 1882 by Fray Francisco Arraya, who laid the church's wooden floor.  The church walls were of tabique but were later replaced by cement.

Heritage Site:  The church is cruciform with a steep roof and a pyramidal crossing tower. Cut stone is used in parts of the church like the façade, however, concrete is found elsewhere.  The real treasure of the church is its wooden floor of alternating dark (tindalo or balayong) and light (molave or tugas) wood planks.  At the transept crossing an eight pointed flower design is used for the floor, while a herringbone pattern is used elsewhere.  The interior is unpainted, unlike most Bohol churches and has altars in the neoclassical idiom.

The convent is located not beside the church as is customary but across the street.  This structure was renovated in the 19th century.  The fencing of the entire campus of the convent is recent.

References

External links

 [ Philippine Standard Geographic Code]
Municipal Government of Valencia, Bohol
Valencia

Municipalities of Bohol